The 1963 Los Angeles State Diablos football team represented Los Angeles State College—now known as California State University, Los Angeles—as a member of the California Collegiate Athletic Association (CCAA) during the 1963 NCAA College Division football season. Led by first-year head coach Homer Beatty, Los Angeles State compiled an overall record of 7–1 with a mark of 3–1 in conference play, sharing the CCAA title with San Diego State. The Diablos played home games at the Rose Bowl in Pasadena, California.

Schedule

Team players in the NFL/AFL
The following Los Angeles State players were selected in the 1964 NFL Draft.

The following Los Angeles State players were selected in the 1964 AFL Draft.

References

Los Angeles State
Cal State Los Angeles Diablos football seasons
California Collegiate Athletic Association football champion seasons
Los Angeles State Diablos football